This article contains a list of notable wikis, which are websites that use wiki software, allowing users to collaboratively edit content and view old versions of the content. These websites use several different wiki software packages.

Table

See also

 History of wikis
 List of online encyclopedias
 List of multilingual MediaWiki sites
 List of wiki software
 Wiki hosting service
 Wiki software
 .wiki

References

External links

A List of Wiki Sites by Category on Lifewire
List of largest wikis on Wikimedia Meta
List of multilingual MediaWiki sites on MediaWiki

List
Wikis
Wiki communities